Phaeobalia peniscissa is a species of dance flies, in the fly family Empididae.

References

Empididae
Insects described in 1889
Taxa named by Theodor Becker
Diptera of Europe